is a city located in Kōchi Prefecture, Japan. , the city had an estimated population of 33,076 in 15350 households and a population density of 49 persons per km².

Geography
Kōnan is located in southeastern Kōchi Prefecture on the island of Shikoku. It faces Tosa Bay on the Pacific Ocean to the south.

Neighbouring municipalities 
Kōchi Prefecture
 Aki
 Nankoku
 Kami
 Geisei

Climate
Kōnan has a Humid subtropical climate (Köppen Cfa) characterized by warm summers and cool winters with light snowfall.  The average annual temperature in Kōnan is 15.2 °C. The average annual rainfall is 2190 mm with September as the wettest month. The temperatures are highest on average in Kitagawa, at around 25.5 °C, and lowest in January, at around 4.9 °C.

Demographics
Per Japanese census data, the population of Kōnan has been increasing since the 1960s.

History 
As with all of Kōchi Prefecture, the area of Kōnan was part of ancient Tosa Province.  During the Edo period, the area was part of the holdings of Tosa Domain ruled by the Yamauchi clan from their seat at Kōchi Castle. The area was organized into villages within Kami District with the creation of the modern municipalities system on April 1, 1889. Akaoka was raised to town status on February 15, 1899, followed by Noichi on February 1, 1926, Yasu on January 1, 1943 and  Kagami on April1, 1955. The city of Kōnan was created by the merger of these four towns and the village of Yoshikawa on March 1, 2006. On the same day, the remaining municipalities of Kami District merged to form the city of Kami, and the district was abolished as a result.

Government
Kōnan has a mayor-council form of government with a directly elected mayor and a unicameral city council of 22 members. Kōnan contributes two members to the Kōchi Prefectural Assembly. In terms of national politics, the village is part of Kōchi 1st district of the lower house of the Diet of Japan.

Economy
Kōnan economy is centered on agriculture.

Education
Kōnan has seven public elementary schools and four public middle schools operated by the city government, and one public high school operated by the Kōchi Prefectural Board of Education.

Transportation

Railway
Tosa Kuroshio Railway - Asa Line
  -  -  -  -

Highways 
  Kōchi-Tōbu Expressway

Local attractions

Heritage Sites

Notable Temples 
 Dainichi-ji (Temple No. 28 in the Shikoku 88 Temples Pilgrimage)
 Enichi-ji (houses three Buddhist statues that are important cultural properties)

Notable Shrines 
 Suruda Hachimangu Shrine

Tourist Sites

Natural Properties 
 Tenshin Great Cedar (National Natural Monument])

Cultural Buildings 
 Ekingura Art Museum
 Noichi Zoological Park of Kochi Prefecture
 Shikoku Automobile Museum
 Ryoma History Museum

Other Sites 
 YaSea Park
 Teikokado Drawbridge

Festivals and Events 
 Suruda Hachimangu Festival
 Ekin Festival - Held annually on the third weekend of July
 Dorome Festival - Held annually in April

Notable people from Kōnan 
 Mika Iwakawa- boxing champion

References

External links

Kōnan City official website 

Cities in Kōchi Prefecture
Populated coastal places in Japan
Kōnan, Kōchi